Nord Anglia Education, commonly referred to as Nord Anglia, is a provider of international schools. The head office is in Nova South, 160 Victoria Street, London.

Nord Anglia has 70+ private day and boarding schools which are located in 30 countries across the Americas, Europe, China, Southeast Asia, India and the Middle East.

History

Nord Anglia Education was founded in 1972 by Kevin McNeany to teach English as a foreign language. The company grew in the 1970s to the 1980s before moving into the UK education market. Soon after, it entered the Eastern and Central Europe market. In the late 1990s and early 2000s, the group also built up a day care and nursery business in addition to its Learning Services arm.

In 2003, Andrew Fitzmaurice became CEO. By 2008, the company had sold its nursery business and mainly focused on international schools.

In 2012, the group relocated to Hong Kong to complement growth plans in China and Southeast Asia. In 2013, it bought World Class Learning Group, with schools in the US, Qatar and Spain.

The company's initial public offering took place on March 26, 2014, on the NYSE.

In 2015, the company bought six schools from Meritas: the Collège du Léman, Léman International School - Chengdu, San Roberto International School, The Village School, North Broward Preparatory School in Florida, and Windermere Preparatory School in Florida.

In April 2017, the company announced it would be taken back into private ownership after the Canada Pension Plan Investment Board and Baring Private Equity Asia agreed to buy it.

In December 2017, the company bought seven schools from the British Schools Foundation: The British College of Brazil, The British International School of Kuala Lumpur, The British School of Nanjing, The British School of Tashkent, The British School of Yangon, The International School of Moscow, and The King's School Manila.

In May 2019 the company relocated operations to London.

In February 2019, the company acquired five schools under the Oakridge International brand in India. The five schools are located in Hyderabad, Vishakhapatnam, Bengaluru and Mohali. The price was estimated at ₹ 16 billion.

In March 2021, the company acquired the Eton School (Mexico) in Mexico City, as well as Oxford International College, Oxford Sixth Form College, and d'Overbroeck's College, three independent schools in Oxford, UK.

In August 2021, the company acquired the Colegio Peruano Británico in Lima, Peru. In June 2022, the company bought Greengates School in Mexico City.

Global Campus 

Nord Anglia students are connected through the Global Campus, a program which offers a wide range of activities undertaken in school, online or at destinations around the world.

Administrative affairs
Its head office is in the Nova South building in City of Westminster, London.

Previously its head office was at the Anglia House in Cheadle, Greater Manchester, and then the Nord House in Burton-upon-Trent, Staffordshire. The head office moved to Hong Kong in 2012. It was in the St. George's Building in Central, Hong Kong. In 2018 the company announced it was returning its head office to the United Kingdom, with London being the new location.

Collaborations 

Nord Anglia has established collaborations with academic institutions such as Juilliard, MIT, and King's College London.

In July 2017, the company partnered with UNICEF as well as the governments of Bulgaria, Argentina, and Malaysia to host an event raising awareness for the Sustainable Development Goals. Nord Anglia also participated with Juilliard, UNICEF and Sing for Hope in the High Level Political Forum on Sustainable Development in July 2019.

Schools

Asia

China 
All Nord Anglia Education schools in China use English as the primary language of instruction. Each student receives four lessons in Mandarin Chinese a week, except in Hong Kong where this is optional. Students reach a proficient level in Mandarin Chinese by the time they leave.

Beijing

The British School of Beijing, Sanlitun
The British School of Beijing, Shunyi
Nord Anglia School Beijing, Shunyi
Nord Anglia School Beijing, Fangshan

Guangzhou

The British School of Guangzhou
Nord Anglia School Guangzhou Panyu
Nord Anglia School Shenzhen
Nord Anglia School Foshan
Hong Kong
Nord Anglia International School Hong Kong

Jiangsu

The British School of Nanjing
Nord Anglia School Jiaxing
Nord Anglia School Nantong
Nord Anglia School Ningbo
Nord Anglia School Suzhou

Shanghai

Nord Anglia International School Shanghai, Pudong
The British International School Shanghai, Puxi
Nord Anglia Chinese International School

Sichuan

Léman International School - Chengdu

Dalian
Dalian Huamei School
Dalian American international school

Southeast Asia 

Cambodia

Northbridge International School Cambodia (Phnom Penh)

Indonesia

 Nord Anglia School Jakarta (NAS Jakarta)

Malaysia

The British International School of Kuala Lumpur

Myanmar

The British School Yangon

Philippines

Nord Anglia International School Manila

Singapore

Dover Court International School

Thailand

St Andrews International School Bangkok

Vietnam

British International School, Hanoi
British International School, Ho Chi Minh City
British Vietnamese International School, Hanoi
British Vietnamese International School, Ho Chi Minh City

India

Oakridge International School, Gachibolwi
Oakridge International School, Bachupally
Oakridge International School Bangalore
Oakridge International School Visakhapatnam
Oakridge International School Mohali

Southwest Asia
Nord Anglia Education operates six schools in Qatar and the UAE. The majority of students are from expat families working in the region's oil industry.

Qatar

Compass International School Doha, Gharaffa
Compass International School Doha, Madinat Khalifa
Compass International School Doha, Rayyan
Compass International School Doha, Themaid
Nord Anglia International School Al Khor

United Arab Emirates

The British International School Abu Dhabi
Nord Anglia International School Dubai

Europe 
Czech Republic

British International School Prague (merger of Prague British School and English International School Prague)

Netherlands (Holland)

Nord Anglia International School Rotterdam

Hungary

British International School Budapest

Ireland

Nord Anglia International School Dublin

Poland

The British School Warsaw

Russia

The International School of Moscow

Slovakia

The British International School Bratislava

Spain

International College Spain

Switzerland

Collège Alpin International Beau Soleil
Collège Champittet, Pully
Collège du Léman
La Côte International School
United Kingdom

 Oxford International College
 Oxford Sixth Form College
 d'Overbroeck's College

North, South and Central America 
Brazil

 British College of Brazil

Ecuador
Colegio Menor Campus Quito
Colegio Menor Campus Samborondon

Mexico
 Greengates School (Mexico)
Eton School
San Roberto International School
 Panama 
 Metropolitan School of Panama

Peru
Colegio Peruano Británico (Lima)

Costa Rica

Country day School (Alajuela)

United States of America

British International School of Boston (Boston, MA)
The British International School of Charlotte
British International School of Chicago, Lincoln Park
British International School of Chicago, South Loop
British International School of Houston
British International School of Washington (Washington, DC)
Nord Anglia International School New York
North Broward Preparatory School (Coconut Creek, Florida)
The Village School (Houston, Texas)
Windermere Preparatory School (Windermere, Florida)

References

External links
 Nord Anglia Education
 

 
Private and independent school organizations
Private school organisations in the United Kingdom
Education companies of the United Kingdom
Educational institutions established in 1972